is the debut single by Aming released on July 21, 1982 in Japan.

Track list
 "Matsu wa" (待つわ) (4:24)
 "Michishirube" (未知標 (みちしるべ)) (4:35)

Personnel

Covers
 The song has been covered by former idol group W (Double You) for their first album Duo U&U.
 It had also been covered in Mandarin by Chinese singer Cheng Fangyuan (Traditional Chinese: 成方圓; Simplified Chinese: 成方圆) under the title "In the Summer" (Traditional Chinese: 在夏季裡; Simplified Chinese：在夏季里).

1982 debut singles
Oricon Weekly number-one singles
Japanese-language songs
1982 songs
Philips Records singles